Jamaica competed at the 1964 Summer Olympics in Tokyo, Japan. This was the first time Jamaica had competed in the Olympics since independence in 1962. 21 competitors, 17 men and 4 women, took part in 16 events in 4 sports.

Athletics

Boxing

Sailing

Shooting

One shooter represented Jamaica in 1964.

50 m pistol
 Tony Bridge

References

External links
Official Olympic Reports

Nations at the 1964 Summer Olympics
1964
1964 in Jamaican sport